SPDE may refer to:
 stochastic partial differential equation
 The stock symbol of Spedus Corp (NASDAQ)